Longstaff may refer to:

People
Abie Longstaff, Australian children's book author
Bert Longstaff (1885–1970), English football player for Brighton & Hove Albion
David Longstaff (born 1974), British ice hockey player and father of Matty and Sean
Ellis Longstaff (born 2002), rugby league footballer
Francis Longstaff (born 1956), American educator
Fred Longstaff (c. 1890–1916), English rugby league footballer
Frederick Longstaff (1879–1961), Anglo-Canadian soldier, architect, and mountaineer
George Longstaff (c. 1947–2003), British bicycle and tricycle builder
George Blundell Longstaff (1849–1921), British civil activist
George W. Longstaff (1850–1901), American architect
Jane Longstaff (1855–1935), British malacologist
Sir John Longstaff (1861–1941), Australian painter and war artist
Johnny Longstaff (fl. 1930s), English anti-fascist activist
Josh Longstaff (born 1982), American basketball coach
Llewellyn W. Longstaff (1841–1918), English industrialist
Luis Longstaff (born 2001), English footballer
Marion L. Longstaff (1904–1984), American politician
Matty Longstaff (born 2000), English footballer and son of David Longstaff
Moorea Longstaff, Canadian para-swimmer
Ronald Earl Longstaff (born 1941), United States federal judge
Sean Longstaff (born 1997), English footballer, son of David Longstaff
Shaun Longstaff (born 1972), rugby union player for Scotland
Suzie Longstaff, (born 1969), British teacher and rower
Tom Longstaff, (1875–1964 ),  English doctor, explorer and mountaineer
Captain Will Longstaff (1879–1953), Australian painter and war artist

Other uses
 Longstaff Peaks, Antarctica
 various weapons including the Gun used in Chinese martial arts

See also
 
 Langstaff (disambiguation)